Derryvore is the name of three townlands in Northern Ireland.

Derryvore, Kinawley

This Derryvore is located in the civil parish of Kinawley in County Fermanagh. It lies on a small peninsula in Upper Lough Erne. Its landscape includes many fens and reedbeds in Erne valley. The area first was a part of the Crom Estate, which according to a map survey done in 1719 and 1721 included the townlands of Derrybeg West, Corraharra, and Derryvore.

It includes a Trinity Church (known locally as Crom Church), commissioned by John Crichton, 3rd Earl Erne.  It was built in 1842 and expanded to include towers in the 1880s.

Derryvore, Enniskillen
This Derryvore is located in the civil parish of Enniskillen in County Fermanagh.

Derryvore, Seagoe
This Derryvore is located in the civil parish of Seagoe in County Armagh.

References 

Villages in County Fermanagh
Townlands of County Fermanagh
Fermanagh and Omagh district